Frank J. Holmes is an American visual artist based in San Francisco, California. Born in Louisville, Kentucky, he is perhaps best known for his collaborations with American musicians The Beach Boys and Van Dyke Parks. He has contributed album or sleeve artwork for their works The Smile Sessions (2011) and Songs Cycled (2013).

References

Living people
21st-century American painters
21st-century American male artists
American conceptual artists
Painters from California
Artists from Louisville, Kentucky
Painters from Kentucky
Art in Greater Los Angeles
American male painters
Year of birth missing (living people)
American contemporary painters